Volleyball for both men and women has been played at the Central American and Caribbean Games since 1930, when the second edition of the  multi-sports event was staged in Havana, Cuba.

Men's Winners

Medal table

Women's Winners

Medal table

References

External links
 CACSO
 Results Page
 Men's Competitions
 Women's Competitions

 
Central American and Caribbean Games
Volleyball